The Whitefish Bay National Forest Scenic Byway is a National Forest Scenic Byway that runs along Whitefish Bay in the Hiawatha National Forest in the U.S. state of Michigan. The byway mostly follows Federal Forest Highway 42 (FFH 42) through Chippewa County in the Upper Peninsula. As a forest highway, it is maintained jointly by the Chippewa County Road Commission (CCRC) and the U.S. Forest Service (USFS). The route of the byway first existed as an earth road by the 1930s; it was improved into a gravel road in the 1940s and paved between the 1950s and the 1980s. The byway designation was created in 1989.

Route description

The byway starts at an intersection with M-123 south of Paradise in the Hiawatha National Forest where it runs eastward along Lake Superior Shoreline Road through birch forests. The roadway runs parallel to the North Country Trail, a hiking trail that spans several northern U.S. states; the trail crosses the road near Naomikong Creek. The byway follows the shoreline running near sandy beaches at the edge of the forest. Along this section, Lake Superior Shoreline Road, which bears the FFH 3150 designation, ends at the intersection with Lakeshore Road. East of here, the byway transitions from FFH 3150 to follow FFH 42 easterly. FFH 42 runs along the shoreline providing access to two campgrounds at Monocle Lake and Bay View as well as picnic areas. The road also provides access to the Point Iroquois Lighthouse which is open for tours. The lighthouse was built in 1870 and offers visitors a view of the Canadian shore at the top of its spiral staircase. After passing through the Point Iroquois area, FFH 42 turns southward to follow the shore line on Iroquois Road, terminating at the national forest boundary west of Brimley. The FFH 42 number is not signed along the roadway.

History

The roadway is part of the Forest Highway System that is funded and administered by the USFS and the Federal Highway Administration; the system was created by the Federal Aid Highway Act of 1921. An earthen roadway was present through the area by 1936. In the beginning of 1937, the easternmost section around Point Iroquois was improved to a gravel road. Two years later, the westernmost section from Naomikong Point to the junction with M-123 was improved to gravel. The entire road surface was improved to gravel by 1945. Paving started on the road in the mid-1950s on the eastern end.

The section through the Naomikong Point area was built starting in 1967 by the Michigan State Highway Department under contract to the USFS. The road, at the time, was intended to be part of a longer scenic highway that would connect a proposed lakeshore road through the Pictured Rocks National Lakeshore with roads running along Whitefish Bay and the St. Marys River south of Sault Ste. Marie. The western end was realigned and paved in the late 1970s, moving the roadway closer to Tahquamenon Bay west of Naomikong Point. The former roadway was removed in the process. The last section was paved in 1987 between the two paved sections at Naomikong and Iroquois points.
 The National Forest Scenic Byway designation was granted on February 8, 1989. The roadway is maintained by the CCRC along with the USFS.

Major intersections

See also

Black River National Forest Scenic Byway, the other National Forest Scenic Byway in the Upper Peninsula
River Road National Scenic Byway, another National Forest Scenic Byway in Michigan

References

External links

Whitefish Bay National Forest Scenic Byway at the US Forest Service
Whitefish Scenic Byway at America's Byways (Federal Highway Administration)
Forest Highways at Michigan Highways

County roads in Michigan
Forest Highways in the United States
National Forest Scenic Byways
Hiawatha National Forest
Scenic highways in Michigan
Transportation in Chippewa County, Michigan